Alex Maiolo is an American musician, writer, and health care reform advocate who lives in the Chapel Hill / Carrboro area of Orange County, North Carolina.

Journalism and writing 

Alex writes about music and recording as a senior contributor to Tape Op magazine and, since 2012, has contributed to Premier Guitar magazine. In 2015 he became a regular contributor to Reverb.com's interviews and tutorial pages. He is considered an authority on effect pedals, and has contributed to the 2019 book Pedal Crush by Danish author Kim Bjørn. Additionally, he contributed two chapters to the 2020 book Patch & Tweak With Moog, by the same author. He writes about music and culture, focusing on Scandinavia, for Fashion Music Style, aka FMS-Mag, and has done press for Danish artists, including Kasper Bjørke, Chorus Grant, TOM and his Computer, and Trentemøller. He is also a regular contributor to the music and culture outlet Louder Than War.

Music 

Maiolo composes for modular synthesizer, solo, and with collaborators, under the name Triple X Snaxxx, which is equally influenced by Motorik, aka Krautrock music, Suzanne Ciani, Detroit Techno, and Giorgio Moroder. Notable performances include  Moogfest 2019, and paired with  Jonas Bjerre of Mew. 
In October 2021, in cooperation with the Telia Company he collaborated with Bjerre, Erki Pärnoja, and Jonas Kaarnamets for Themes For Great Cities: Tallinn, the first in a series of concept pieces celebrating cities that receive less attention than the usual suspects. It premiered at Tallinn Music Week. President Kersti Kaljulaid was in attendance. Past collaboration and curatorial work includes The Suburban Summit, near Copenhagen Denmark, a one week writing project with Toko Yasuda, John Schmersal, Bo Madsen, Dave Allen of Gang of Four, and Nils Gröndahl, among others. 
He has played electric guitar in the pop band Fan Modine, bass guitar for the Chapel Hill neo-psychedelic band Violet Vector and the Lovely Lovelies, and guitar with Tim Sommer's ambient pop band Hi Fi Sky. He is currently the guitarist in the garage rock / psychedelic rock band Lacy Jags.

In 2010 he was asked by Chris Stamey to aid in organizing a live performance of Big Star's Third/Sister Lovers record with guest musicians including Jody Stephens, the only surviving member of the band, Mitch Easter, Will Rigby, and Mike Mills of R.E.M. The performance was repeated at Webster Hall, in New York City, on March 26, 2011, again with Stephens, Easter, Rigby, and Mills, and also included Michael Stipe, Matthew Sweet, Norman Blake of Teenage Fanclub, Ira Kaplan, Tift Merritt, and many other guest musicians.

Maiolo is also a recordist whose work has been featured on the John Peel show.  In 2010 he opened Seriously Adequate Studio, a small, two room facility, where notables such as Brian Paulson, Lost in the Trees, The Kingsbury Manx, Schooner, Demon Eye, and Merge Records recording artists Polvo and The Love Language have worked.

In 2015 he became a voting member of National Academy of Recording Arts and Sciences (aka The GRAMMYS), Producers & Engineers Wing. He also serves South by Southwest Music Festival in an advisory capacity.

Activism 

Maiolo is an advocate for health care reform in the United States, particularly the issue of health insurance access for musicians and other creative professionals. He supports a comprehensive national health insurance plan for all United States citizens.

He has presented on the need for affordable health insurance options for musicians at conferences including South by Southwest, CMJ Music Marathon, the SF MusicTech Summit, the Creative Chicago Expo, and the Pitchfork Music Festival. He has been interviewed on the subject for publications including Pitchfork Media, Spin, the Chicago Tribune, Crawdaddy!, Time, and contributed op-eds to the Chicago Tribune and Billboard.

Since 2001, Maiolo has worked with the national non-profit organization Future of Music Coalition. In 2005, Maiolo and the Future of Music Coalition received a grant from the Nathan Cummings Foundation to develop the Health Insurance Navigation Tool (HINT), a free service offering musicians advice and information about their health insurance options.

On May 28, 2010, Maiolo and other Carrboro-area musicians performed in a tribute concert remembering recently deceased Big Star lead singer Alex Chilton. Because Chilton was uninsured at the time of his death, Chilton's widow opted to donate the proceeds of the concert to HINT.

In 2016 he had a featured role in the film Boycott Band, a mockumentary produced by McKinney to call attention to the futility of North Carolina's House Bill 2, also known as Bathroom Bill, which discriminates against transgender people. It received high praise from trade journals such as Adweek.

References

External links 
 Health Insurance Navigation Tool (HINT) official page
 Future of Music Coalition official site
 "Better Days: What U.S. Health Care Reform Means for Working Musicians" (Billboard Magazine op-ed) 
 "End the Need for Benefit Concerts" (Chicago Tribune op-ed)
 "The struggle for musicians' health insurance" (Independent Weekly)
 "Taking the Pulse on Musicians and Health Insurance" (KnowTheMusicBiz.com)
 WKNC Eye on the Triangle interview

Living people
Healthcare reform advocacy groups in the United States
Place of birth missing (living people)
Year of birth missing (living people)
American bass guitarists